Time in Place may refer to:
Time in Place (Mike Stern album)
Time in Place (Artifex Pereo album)